The Architectural Engineering Institute (AEI) is the professional organization for architectural engineers.  It is managed as a semi-autonomous division of the American Society of Civil Engineers (ASCE), like the Structural Engineering Institute.

Information
ASCE and ASHRAE are the  delegated societies for the architectural engineering's ABET accreditation process. However, AEI has successfully developed, with NCEES, the architectural engineering professional engineering registration examination which was first offered in 2003.  AEI's postal address is 1801 Alexander Bell Drive, Reston, VA, 20191-4400 USA.

See also
Architectural engineering
American Society of Civil Engineers (ASCE)
ASHRAE

External links
Official AEI Website
Water Damage Restoration

Building engineering organizations
Architecture-related professional associations
American Society of Civil Engineers